Comorn is an unincorporated community in King George County, Virginia, United States.

"Comorn" is an English form of the name of Komárom, a historic town in Hungary which had a prominent place in the Hungarian Revolution of 1848.

Marmion was listed on the National Register of Historic Places in 1992.

References

Unincorporated communities in Virginia
Unincorporated communities in King George County, Virginia